The sooty antbird (Hafferia fortis) is a species of bird in the family Thamnophilidae. It is found in Bolivia, Brazil, Colombia, Ecuador, and Peru. Its natural habitat is subtropical or tropical moist lowland forests.

The sooty antbird was described and illustrated by the English ornithologists Philip Sclater and Osbert Salvin in 1868 and given the binomial name Percnostola fortis. The species was later included in the genus Myrmeciza. A molecular phylogenetic study published in 2013 found that Myrmeciza was polyphyletic. In the resulting rearrangement to create monophyletic genera the sooty antbird was moved to the newly erected genus Hafferia.

References

Further reading

sooty antbird
Birds of the Amazon Basin
Birds of the Colombian Amazon
Birds of the Peruvian Amazon
Birds of the Ecuadorian Amazon
Birds of the Bolivian Amazon
sooty antbird
sooty antbird
sooty antbird
Taxonomy articles created by Polbot
Taxobox binomials not recognized by IUCN